is a Japanese manga series written by Yuki Suenaga and illustrated by Takamasa Moue. It follows teenager Akane Osaki as she aims to reach the highest rank in rakugo, partly to avenge her father, who was expelled from the profession six years earlier. The rakugo in the series is supervised by professional rakugoka Keiki Hayashiya. Akane-banashi has been serialized in Shueisha's shōnen manga magazine Weekly Shōnen Jump since February 2022, with the chapters collected into four tankōbon volumes as of December 2022. Viz Media has licensed the series for English release in North America.

Akane-banashi has received positive reception from reviewers and was nominated for the 2022 Next Manga Award in the print category.

Plot
Growing up, Akane admired her father and his rakugo; a traditional Japanese form of storytelling where a lone performer, called a rakugoka, depicts a long, complicated, and usually funny story involving multiple characters, who are distinguished by changes in pitch, tone, slight turns of the head, and hand movements, all while sitting in place. But when she was in elementary school, her father and all the other applicants were expelled from the Arakawa School during the promotional test to obtain rakugos third and highest rank of shin'uchi. Six years later, Akane, who had been secretly receiving lessons from her father's former master, sets out to become a shin'uchi of the Arakawa School to avenge her father and prove rakugo is a legitimate profession.

Characters

As a child she got angry whenever a classmate or their parents looked down on her father for his chosen career, and hates that he was forced to give up his dream and get a "real job". Akane is set to become a formal rakugoka apprentice, starting at the first rank known as zenza, under Shiguma Arakawa after graduating high school.

The number two master of the Arakawa School who specializes in sentimental tales of the ninjo-banashi style and who taught Akane's father. After Shinta was expelled, Shiguma felt unfit to take on any more pupils. But he has been secretly teaching Akane rakugo for the last six years, and agrees to formally take her on as a pupil after she graduates high school, which is unusually late.

Master Shiguma's newest pupil who joined shortly before Shinta was expelled and just recently reached rakugos second rank of futatsume.

A 28-year-old futatsume in his ninth year of rakugo under Master Shiguma. Ever since Shinta was expelled, Kyoji is the disciplinarian who keeps the other pupils in line. His seriousness makes the back-and-forth banter in his rakugo even funnier. He offers to take Akane under his wing.

A 29-year-old futatsume in his 11th year of rakugo under Master Shiguma. He is a Tokyo University graduate and the Shiguma School's best terakoya; master of old literary teachings. He meticulously researches every rakugo story he performs, including the daily customs of the period it came from, and turns into a completely different person onstage as far as his appearance and demeanor.

A futatsume and the most senior pupil under Master Shiguma. He fancies himself a ladies' man.

The number one master of the Arakawa School, who is considered one of the greatest rakugoka of his generation. Six years ago, he was the chief judge who expelled Akane's father and the other shin'uchi applicants.

An obnoxious futatsume under Master Issho. He reached that rank at 19-years-old, after only two years of apprenticeship. He is particularly skilled at portraying seductive characters, which makes his silly ones stand out even more.

Production
Author Yuki Suenaga stated that Akane-banashi originated with Akane, a character he created but did not know what to do with. A fan of manzai and conte, he was interested in rakugo, but felt it was too difficult to get into. Suspecting there were many people who felt the same way, and that it was unexpected of the character, he decided to have Akane perform rakugo. Suenaga stated that because he is new to rakugo, he is able to predict the things readers might not know, and can depict them in the manga in a way they will understand.

Artist Takamasa Moue said when he first heard about the series he found it interesting, but worried whether readers of Weekly Shōnen Jump would be interested in rakugo. Realizing it was his job to make them interested, he said he tried to get readers emotionally invested in the characters, and to broaden the scope to appeal to those unfamiliar with rakugo. Having previously only had a passing interest in rakugo, Moue said he had fun researching it for Akane-banashi. To draw the rakugo scenes in the manga, Moue listens to a performance of the relative story and thinks about how to convey the speed and intonation.

Gendai Business columnist Kenichiro Horii wrote that Akane-banashis Arakawa School is clearly modeled after the real-life Tatekawa School of rakugo, whose master, Danshi Tatekawa VII, expelled a group of zenza in 2002, after feeling that they were not showing enough effort to reach futatsume. Although Kazuhiro Ito of Good Life with Books also noted the similarities, he reported that Suenaga stated Issho Arakawa was instead modeled after Enshō Sanyūtei VI. Horii also pointed out that the Rakugo Café seen in the series is modeled after a real café with a similar name in Jinbōchō, Tokyo. For the colored title page of chapter 29, Moue was inspired by The Breakfast Club.

Publication
Written by Yuki Suenaga and illustrated by Takamasa Moue, Akane-banashi began serialization in Weekly Shōnen Jumps 11th issue of 2022, which was released on February 14, 2022. The rakugo in the series is supervised by professional rakugoka Keiki Hayashiya. Publisher Shueisha is collecting the individual chapters into tankōbon volumes, with the first released on June 3, 2022. Both Shueisha and Viz Media began releasing the series in English the same day it began in Japan, the former on its Manga Plus website and application.

Volume list

Chapters not yet in tankōbon format
These chapters have yet to be published in a tankōbon volume. They were serialized in Weekly Shōnen Jump.

Other media
Akane-banashi is receiving a motion comic adaptation, where voice actors, music and sound effects are heard as the manga images appear on screen. The episodes are uploaded to Jump Comics' official YouTube channel, with the first part of chapter one uploaded on June 4, 2022. Akane and her father are voiced by Akane and Kappei Yamaguchi. In addition to being actual daughter and father, the Yamaguchis are also both rakugoka.

Reception
By September 2022, the collected volumes of Akane-banashi had over 200,000 copies in circulation and volume one had been reprinted four times. The series has been recommended by Eiichiro Oda and Hideaki Anno. It was nominated for the 2022 Next Manga Award in the print manga category and ranked 3rd out of 50 nominees. The series ranked fourth in the 2023 edition of Takarajimasha's Kono Manga ga Sugoi! list of best manga for male readers. It ranked third in the Nationwide Bookstore Employees Recommended Comics of 2023. Akane-banashi is currently nominated for the 16th Manga Taishō.

Steven Blackburn of Screen Rant praised the first chapter of Akane-banashi. He wrote that the sudden shift in protagonists from Shinta, "a stereotypical hero who embodies everything that makes a successful shonen [manga]", to Akane, an unconventional hero who is essentially a wunderkind, already makes the latter character compelling. "That's a difficult dynamic to achieve, but Akane-banashi has somehow succeeded before it's even begun". In a review for Multiversity Comics, Zach Wilkerson gave the "immensely charming and well crafted" first chapter an 8.5 rating, with particular praise for Moue's art. Robbie Pleasant of the same website strongly praised the series and its art for successfully conveying how a performer's demeanor and voice changes as they perform different characters, despite manga being a static and soundless medium.

In May 2022, Kota Mukaihara of Real Sound wrote that Akane-banashi was poised to be a breakout hit. He felt that although Akane's progress in rakugo seemed to be going unusually fast and smooth, with her not yet being confronted by a tough challenge or failing at something, this allows readers to follow her growth without unnecessary stress. Mukaihara speculated that, while this could simply be because the manga was still new and needed to develop quickly in order to gain momentum, it emphasizes Akane's cleverness and the depth of her determination and is a testament to the charm of the characters and the skill with which the story is written. He also wrote that while Akane's outgoing personality and unprecedented skill make her seem like a maverick, her positivity and down-to-earth nature make her a likable character. Blackburn's colleague Benjamin Sockol praised later chapters of the series for "subverting the classic tournament arc trope", writing that Akane-banashi feels fresh and different from anything else in Weekly Shōnen Jump and is one of the most exciting manga currently running in the magazine as of June 2022.

References

External links
  
 
 
 

2022 manga
Coming-of-age anime and manga
Rakugo
Shōnen manga
Shueisha manga
Theatre in anime and manga
Viz Media manga